The term airplane (equivalent to "aeroplane" in non-US English) typically refers to any powered fixed-wing aircraft.

Airplane(s) may also refer to:

Film and television
 Airplane!, a 1980 American comedy film
 Airplane II: The Sequel, the 1982 sequel to the above film

Music
 Jefferson Airplane, often referred to as "the Airplane", an American rock music band
 Airplane (Arvingarna album), 1998
 Airplane (EP), a 1998 EP by Rusted Root
 "Airplane", a song by Baboon from their 2006 self-titled album
 "Airplane", a 1977 song by The Beach Boys from their album Love You
 "Airplane", a 2010 song by Plain White T's from their album Wonders of the Younger
 "Airplanes" (song), a 2010 song by B.o.B featuring Hayley Williams
 "Airplanes", a 2009 song by Local Natives

See also 
Aeroplane (disambiguation)
Aircraft